The French submarine Regnault (Q113) was a  built for the French Navy built between 1913 and 1924. It was laid down in the Arsenal de Toulon shipyards and launched on June 25, 1924. Regnault was completed in 1924 and served in the French Marine Nationale until 1937.

Design
The Lagrange-class submarines were constructed as part of the French fleet's expansion programmes from 1913 to 1914. During construction, though, the idea was abandoned and the ships were instead equipped with diesel engines.

Propulsion while surfaced was provided by two  diesel motors built by the Swiss manufacturer Sulzer and two  electric motors.

The ships were equipped with eight 450 mm torpedo tubes (four in the bow, two stern and two external), with a total of 10 torpedoes and two on-board guns. The class was also armed with a 75 mm gun with an ammo supply of 440 shells. The crew of one ship consisted of four officers and 43 of officers and seamen.

Service history
Regnault was built in the Arsenal de Toulon. It was laid down in 1913, launched on 25 June 1924, and completed in 1924. It was named in honor of the distinguished French nineteenth-century chemist Henri Victor Regnault and was assigned the pennant number Q113. Regnault served in the Mediterranean Sea until 1935.

Citations

References 
 
 
 
 

World War I submarines of France
Lagrange-class submarines
1924 ships